BinckBank is a Dutch stockbrokerage that offers an electronic trading platform to trade financial assets.

History
The company was founded in 2000 by four former employees of IMG Holland, a defunct broker. The company was only acting as a broker in the professional market between banks and derivative firms. In October 2000, Binck opened a retail branch. Major trading firm AOT financed the start-up partly, taking a 52% stake, and bought the remaining shares in 2004.

In 2007, Binck acquired Alex Beleggingsbank from Rabobank for €390 million euros.

In 2009, Binck announced a joint venture with the Dutch market maker Optiver to create a platform to internalize Binck's order-flow to Optiver.

In 2019, the company was acquired by Saxo Bank.

References

External links

Financial services companies of the Netherlands
Companies based in Amsterdam
2000 establishments in the Netherlands